The 2014–15 season is a season played by Cercle Brugge, a Belgian football club based in Bruges, West Flanders. The season covers the period from 1 July 2014 to 30 June 2015. Cercle Brugge will be participating in the Belgian Pro League and Belgian Cup.

Review

Background

Pre-season
It was announced that Cercle Brugge would play ten matches in preparation for the 2014–15 season, with games against Damme, Oudenburg, Deinze, Sterk Door Combinatie Putten, Vitesse Arnhem, Mechelen, Roeselare, Westerlo, Eendracht Aalst and Al Shabab with the pre-season matches starting from 21 June 2014 and ending on 20 July 2014.

Cercle Brugge's pre-season matches got off to a high-scoring start, with the club scoring seventeen goals in two matches. It started on 21 June with a 0–7 win away to Damme, with new signings Richard Sukuta-Pasu and Stipe Bačelić-Grgić grabbing a goal each along with Karel Van Roose, Bart Buysse, Tim Smolders and a brace from Stephen Buyl. They followed that up with a convincing 0–10 win over Oudenburg, Stephen Buyl scored twice for the second match running while Junior Kabananga scored a hat-trick with the other goals coming from Lukas Van Eenoo, Stephen Buyl, Thibaut Van Acker, Ayron Verkindere and Stipe Bačelić-Grgić.

They continued their fine scoring form into their next two pre-season friendlies, firstly playing out a thrilling 3–4 win against Deinze in a match played at Zeveren Sportief's ground. Followed by a 0–6 win against Sterk Door Combinatie Putten. On 4 July, they drew 1–1 with Eredivisie side Vitesse Arnhem, Stef Wils got Cercle Brugge's only goal of the game to earn a draw at the GelreDome. That was followed by a second consecutive draw when the club tied 0–0 with fellow Belgian Pro League side Mechelen. Cercle Brugge returned to winning ways when they earned a 3–0 victory over Roeselare, with the goals coming from Hans Cornelis, Noë Dussenne and Tim Smolders.

Cercle Brugge failed to find a win in their last two pre-season friendlies, on 17 July they suffered a 0–2 loss to Eendracht Aalst followed by a 1–1 draw three days later to Al Shabab on 20 July at Jan Breydel Stadium.

Cercle Brugge confirmed their first signing for the 2014–15 season on 4 March 2014, it was announced that 21-year-old striker Sam Valcke would join the club from Belgian Third Division side Londerzeel for an undisclosed fee. Sixteen days later the club announced their second signing for the summer, 28-year-old goalkeeper Olivier Werner was signed from Mons. Cercle Brugge signed another goalkeeper on 17 April, when the club completed the signing of Thomas De Bie from Mechelen, that was after the 17-year-old rejected a new contract offer from the aforementioned Belgian Pro League side and also rejected an offer from Gent.

In May, Cercle Brugge signed former German youth international Richard Sukuta-Pasu for an undisclosed fee from 2. Bundesliga side Kaiserslautern, the 24-year-old signed a three-year contract. Just under a month later the club signed Croatian midfielder Stipe Bačelić-Grgić from NK Hrvatski Dragovoljac. Within the next three days, Cercle Bruggle completed two signings in two days. Firstly on 13 June the club signed 20-year-old defender Pierre Bourdin from Paris Saint-Germain, with the Frenchman signing a three-year contract. On 14 June they signed Noë Dussenne following the Belgian's contract expiring at Mons, he also signed a three-year contract.

Two players left the squad from April to June, Thomas Goddeeris was the first player to exit. The versatile defender who can also play in midfield joined lower league side Torhout 1992 KM on a permanent contract after a successful loan spell at the club. Bram Verbist joined Dutch Eerste Divisie club Roda JC Kerkrade on a free transfer on 28 June. As Joris Delle left the club after his loan spell from Nice had expired and Joey Godee returned from his loan spell at Go Ahead Eagles, the club loaned out two players to Deinze. First of all Arne Naudts left on 23 May, while Alessio Staelens joined the Belgian Third Division club on 4 July.

Competitions

Friendlies

Belgian Pro League

League table

Matches

Relegation Play off

Belgian Cup

Appearances and goals

Transfers

Transfers in

Loans in

Transfers out

Loans out

References

Cercle Brugge K.S.V.
Cercle Brugge K.S.V. seasons